Beuern is the name of some German municipalities. It may refer to:

Benediktbeuern, Bavaria
Buseck, Hesse